Angraecum distichum is a species of comet orchid that is found across sub-Saharan and tropical Africa.

Ecology 
It can be found growing on the phorophytes Klainedoxa gabonensis, Gilbertiodendron dewevrei, Mangifera indica and in cocoa plantations. It can also occur with Calamus, Uapaca heudelotii and Irvingia smithii, and in the undergrowth with Marantaceae and Zingiberaceae.

References

distichum
Plants described in 1836